"Dear Brother" is a duet by Hank Williams and Audrey Williams.  It was released by MGM Records in 1949.  They recorded it with Fred Rose producing at Castle Studio in Nashville on March 1, 1949 and were backed by Dale Potter (fiddle), Don Davis (steel guitar), Zeke Turner (lead guitar), Clyde Baum (mandolin), Jack Shook (rhythm guitar), and probably Ernie Newton (bass). Audrey was six months pregnant at the time of the recording. By February 1950 it had sold 739 copies.

References

Bibliography

1949 songs
1949 singles
Hank Williams songs
Songs written by Hank Williams